Black hole greybody factors are functions of frequency and angular momentum that characterizes the deviation of the emission-spectrum of a black hole from a pure black-body spectrum. As a result of quantum effects, an isolated black hole emits radiation that, at the black-hole horizon, matches the radiation from a perfect black body. However,  this radiation is scattered by the geometry of the black hole itself. Stated more intuitively, the particles emitted by the black hole are subject to the gravitational attraction of the black hole and so some of them fall back into the black hole. As a result, the actual spectrum measured by an asymptotic observer deviates from a black-body spectrum. This deviation is captured by the greybody factors. The name "greybody" is simply meant to indicate the difference of the spectrum of a black hole from a pure black body. 

The greybody factors can be computed by a classical scattering computation of a wave-packet off the black hole.

Mathematical definition

where k is the Boltzmann constant and T is the Hawking temperature of the black hole. The constant in the denominator is 1 for Bosons and -1 for Fermions. The factors  are called the greybody factors of the black hole. For a charged black hole, these factors may also depend on the charge of the emitted particles.

References

Black holes
Astrophysics